Büchel or Buechel is both a surname of Liechtenstein origin and place name and may refer to:

People
Benjamin Büchel (born 1989), Liechtenstein footballer
Charles Buchel (1872–1950), British artist
Christoph Büchel (born 1966), Swiss artist
Emanuel Büchel (1705–1775), Swiss painter
Eugen Büchel (1916–1978), Liechtenstein bobsledder
Eugene Buechel (1874–1954), American Jesuit
Gebhard Büchel (born 1921), Liechtenstein decathlete
Magnus Büchel (born 1960), Liechtenstein judoka
Marcel Büchel (born 1991), Austrian footballer
Marco Büchel (born 1971), Liechtenstein alpine skier
Markus Büchel (1959–2013), Liechtenstein politician and head of government
Martin Büchel (born 1987), Liechtenstein footballer
Robert Büchel (born 1968), Liechtenstein alpine skier
Ronny Büchel (born 1982), Liechtenstein footballer
Selina Büchel (born 1991), Swiss middle-distance runner
Stefan Büchel (born 1986), Liechtenstein footballer
Wilhelm Büchel ((1873–1951), Liechtenstein politician and farmer

Places
Büchel (municipality), a municipality in the Cochem-Zell district of Rhineland-Palatinate, Germany
Büchel Air Base
Büchel, Thuringia, in the Sömmerda district of Thuringia, Germany
Buechel, Louisville, a neighborhood within the city limits of Louisville, Kentucky, United States

See also
Buechele

Surnames of Liechtenstein origin
German-language surnames